The Evenk Hydroelectric Power Plant, formerly the HPP Turukhansk, is a proposed power station on the Lower Tunguska River in the Krasnoyarsk Territory of Russia. The projected dam will be the largest hydroelectric power station in Russia, with a capacity of 12,000 MW and a possible upsized capacity of 20,000 MW. It will also be one of the largest in the world after the Chinese Three Gorges Dam, at 22,500 MW, and the South American Itaipu Dam, at 14,000 MW.

References

External links

Hydroelectric power stations in Russia